Limited depravity is the doctrine that denies original sin has entirely tainted human free will. Instead, the doctrine asserts that all humans, while unable not to sin, have the inherent ability to accept Jesus Christ's offer of salvation. This belief is held by Pelagianism, Semi-Pelagianism, and some who call themselves Arminians. It is rejected by Calvinists and most Arminians including Jacobus Arminius himself, his followers, the Remonstrants, John Wesley and most Methodists.

Christian hamartiology
Christian terminology